Reinickendorf is a locality of Berlin in the borough of Reinickendorf. It had a population of 83,972 in 2020.

Geography

The locality is situated in the south-western side of its district. It borders the localities of Tegel in the west, Wittenau and Borsigwalde in the north. To the east are Wilhelmsruh, Niederschönhausen and Pankow, all three in the Pankow borough, to the south Gesundbrunnen and Wedding, both in the borough of Mitte.

History
The name of the former Reinickendorf village can be traced back to a peasant Reinhardt (Reineke in Low German), who settled here around 1230. The locality was first mentioned in a 1345 deed and acquired by the City of Berlin in 1397. The late 19th century saw a significant increase in population, when Reinickendorf received direct access to Berlin with the opening of the Nordbahn railway line to Neustrelitz in 1877.

Reinickendorf was incorporated into the City of Berlin by the 1920 Greater Berlin Act. In 1928, architect Otto Rudolf Salvisberg designed the Weiße Stadt (White City), part of the Berlin Modernist Housing Estates, a UNESCO World Heritage Site.

Transportation
Reinickendorf is served by the Berlin S-Bahn lines S1, S25, S85 and by the U-Bahn line U8. The S-Bahn stations are Schönholz, Wilhelmsruh, Alt-Reinickendorf, Karl Bonhoeffer Nervenklinik and Eichborndamm. The U-Bahn stations are Rathaus Reinickendorf, Karl Bonhoeffer Nervenklinik, Lindauer Allee, Paracelsus Bad, Residenzstraße and Franz Neumann Platz.

Photogallery

See also
 Berlin-Reinickendorf (electoral district)
 Berlin-Reinickendorf station

References

External links

 Reinickendorf page of borough site

 
Localities of Berlin
Populated places established in the 13th century